Matthew Stephenson may refer to:

Matthew C. Stephenson, professor of law at Harvard Law School
Matt Stephenson, Canadian ice hockey player
Matt Stephenson (racehorse trainer) (1735-1808), Epsom Derby-winning jockey and trainer